J. Joseph Curran Jr. (born July 7, 1931) is an American lawyer and the longest serving elected Attorney General (1987 to 2007) in Maryland history, and previously the fourth Lieutenant Governor of Maryland from 1983 to 1987. His son-in-law, Martin J. O'Malley, served as the 61st Governor of Maryland from 2007 to 2015.

Background
Curran was born in West Palm Beach, Florida, the son of Catherine Mary (Clark) and Baltimore City Council member J. Joseph Curran, Sr. He attended Baltimore parochial schools. He graduated from Loyola High School and then from the University of Baltimore. He served in the U.S. Air Force from 1951 to 1955. Curran returned to Baltimore and entered the University of Baltimore School of Law where he earned a LL.B. in 1959. Curran was admitted to the Maryland Bar in 1959 and is a member of the Maryland State Bar Association.

Career
A Democrat, Curran previously served as the Lieutenant Governor of Maryland from 1983 to 1987 under Governor Harry Hughes. Prior to that, Curran was a member of the Maryland House of Delegates from 1959 to 1963 and the Maryland Senate from 1963 to 1983.

Attorney general
In 1986, Curran was elected attorney general after serving four years as lieutenant governor with Governor Harry R. Hughes. In 1990, 1994, 1998, and 2002, he won re-election. As attorney general, Curran initiated Maryland improvements in the areas of consumer protection, criminal investigations, Medicaid fraud prosecution, securities regulation, antitrust enforcement, and protection of children and teens, parents, seniors, and victims of domestic violence and sexual predation. He worked to strengthen criminal laws against gun violence and prescription drug abuse, and was an opponent of slot machines and casino gambling.
Children & teens – Curran backed a 2004 law making it a crime to solicit a minor by computer or other means to engage in unlawful sexual conduct. He proposed lifetime parole supervision for sex offenders and better notification to communities when sex offenders are released from prison. He led Maryland's participation in a $206 billion national settlement with the tobacco industry, which garnered $4.4 billion for Maryland, and industry concessions on advertising and marketing cigarettes to teens. His office filed suits to stop unlawful Internet cigarette sales and the use of hip-hop themes to target youth, and reached agreements with national cigarette retailers to prevent sales to youth.
Prescription drugs – Curran created a website to allow consumers to compare retail prices charged by different pharmacies in Maryland for commonly used prescription drugs. His office developed educational outreach materials to help seniors make decisions about Medicare Part D, then a complex new federal prescription drug benefit. His office released a report on the growing problem of prescription drug abuse among Maryland teens and adults, and developed a blueprint for a prescription monitoring program to help law enforcement and health professionals reduce drug diversion and abuse and improve pharmaceutical therapy.
Crime and gun violence – In a 1990 case, Maryland v. Craig, the U.S. Supreme Court sided with Maryland and upheld a law permitting victims of child abuse to testify via one-way television. The attorney general successfully litigated Maryland v. Wilson (1997), also before the Supreme Court. He argued that police officers, who routinely conduct traffic stops that sometimes turn deadly, may order the passenger out of the car to allow the officer to safely process the traffic stop.  Curran led efforts to reduce gun violence. He sought laws and resources to reduce gun crime, including calling for restrictions on handgun ownership and establishing a firearms trafficking unit to prosecute those who unlawfully purchase or attempt to purchase firearms.
Slot-machine & casino gambling – Curran consistently opposed efforts to bring slot-machine and casino gambling to the state.  His 1995 study, "The House Never Loses and Maryland Cannot Win", concluded that the costs of slot machines far outweigh the benefits.

Retirement
Citing his age and his long career, Curran decided not to seek re-election in 2006, preventing any conflict of interest that might arise in having O'Malley as governor and his father-in-law as attorney general.

Family
Curran is the brother of Martin "Mike" Curran and Robert W. Curran who both also served on the Baltimore City Council.
Curran is married with four living children, three daughters and one son. His youngest daughter, Katie, was a state district court judge (2001–2021) and the wife of former Governor Martin O'Malley, his middle daughter, Alice, is the chief financial officer at Miami Country Day School, a private school in South Florida, and his son, J. Joseph "Max" Curran, is a partner at the Saul Ewing law firm. His first cousin was Gerald Curran.

Awards and honors
Curran has received various awards, including:

AARP Maryland named its lifetime achievement award after Curran, which is presented to those "who have exhibited a lifetime of exemplary commitment to volunteerism and civic involvement".

References

1931 births
Democratic Party members of the Maryland House of Delegates
Lawyers from Baltimore
Lieutenant Governors of Maryland
Living people
Maryland Attorneys General
Politicians from Baltimore
University of Baltimore School of Law alumni